1983 ... Summer Breaks was a various artists "hits" collection album released in Australia in 1983 on EMI (Catalogue No. GIVE 2009). The album spent 3 weeks at the top of the Australian album charts in 1983.

Track listing

Charts

References

Summer Breaks, 1983
Pop compilation albums
EMI Records compilation albums